Juan Oliver y Astorga (1733–1830) was a Spanish composer. Oliver y Astorga spent several successful years in London before returning to Spain to take up a post as violinist in the Capilla Real, Madrid, in 1776.

References

1733 births
1830 deaths
Spanish composers
Spanish male composers